Wilbur Smyth Eaton (February 2, 1903 – August 10, 1993) was an American football player and college basketball coach.  He played college football for the Notre Dame Fighting Irish from 1923 to 1924 alongside the famed Four Horsemen.

Eaton served as the head football coach at Mount St. Charles College—now known as Carroll College—in Helena, Montana from 1926 to 1930 and at the University of St. Thomas in St Paul, Minnesota in 1933. He was also the head basketball coach at Howard College—now known as Samford University—in Homewood, Alabama during the 1931–32 season.

References

1903 births
1993 deaths
American football ends
Basketball coaches from Nebraska
Carroll Fighting Saints football coaches
Notre Dame Fighting Irish football coaches
Notre Dame Fighting Irish football players
St. Thomas (Minnesota) Tommies football coaches
Samford Bulldogs football coaches
Samford Bulldogs men's basketball coaches
Sportspeople from Omaha, Nebraska
Players of American football from Nebraska